Hackney Central is a ward in the London Borough of Hackney and forms part of the Hackney South and Shoreditch constituency.

The ward returns three councillors to Borough Council, with an election every four years. At the previous election on 6 May 2010 Alan Laing, Samantha Lloyd, and Vincent Stops all Labour Party candidates, were returned. Turnout was 59%; with 5,126 votes cast.

Hackney Central ward has a total population of 10,290. This compares with the average ward population within the borough of 10,674. The population of the ward at the 2011 census was 12,548.

References

External links
 London Borough of Hackney list of constituencies and councillors.
 Labour Party profile of Alan Laing
 Labour Party profile of Samantha Lloyd
 Labour Party profile of Vincent Stops

Wards of the London Borough of Hackney
2002 establishments in England
Hackney, London
Hackney Central